Ouro Branco is a Brazilian municipality located in the state of Minas Gerais. The city belongs to the Mesoregion Metropolitana de Belo Horizonte and to the Microregion of Conselheiro Lafaiete. As of 2020, the city has a population of 39,867 inhabitants.
The name "Ouro Branco" means "White Gold", as opposed to "Black Gold" - Ouro Preto. The city was an important base on the transportation route from the mines of Minas Gerais to the coast.

See also
 List of municipalities in Minas Gerais

References

External links 
 

Municipalities in Minas Gerais